Hildegunn Eggen  (born 27 July 1953) is a Norwegian actress.

She was educated at the Norwegian National Academy of Theatre, and has been assigned with the theatres Nationaltheatret and Trøndelag Teater. She received the Norwegian Theatre Critics Award  for 2001/2002, the Gammleng Award in 2008, and the Hedda Award in 2017. She was decorated Knight of the Order of St. Olav in 2014.

References

1953 births
Living people
Norwegian stage actresses
Norwegian film actresses
Norwegian television actresses
Place of birth missing (living people)